Stalkers is a comic book series that lasted twelve issues created in 1990 by Jan Strnad, Mark Verheiden and Mark Texeira, and published by Marvel Comics imprint Epic Comics.

It concerns a series of people working for a private anti-terrorism security firm that is franchised across the country. Some are mentally unstable and kidnapped to become disposable assassins. A co-story concerns a nihilistic detective and a psychic.

References

1990 comics debuts
Epic Comics titles
Superhero comics